Kaiser Chuang or Chuang Kai-hsun (born 22 March 1981) is a Taiwanese actor.

Early life and career
Born in Changhua County, Chuang graduated from the department of drama of Taipei National University of the Arts.

He has appeared in the films Step Back to Glory (2013), Who Is Undercover (2014) and The Tenants Downstairs (2016) and several plays and television series such as Breaking Free (2011) and Happy 300 Days (2013).

In 2015, Chuang received double nominations for the Golden Bell Award for Best Actor in a Miniseries or Television Film at the 50th Golden Bell Awards and won the award for his performance in The Road Home. The following year he won the Best Supporting Actor award at the 18th Taipei Film Festival for Maverick (2015).

He participated in the HBO Asia TV series “Trinity of Shadows” which consists of 15 one-hour episodes, as up-and-coming public official. The first two will launch on June 13, 2021, and be followed every subsequent Sunday with further instalments. The series will play on HBO Go and HBO in Asia.

Personal life
On August 2, 2016, Chuang married his girlfriend of two years, Liao Yi-an (Xiao An), who works in the fashion industry and who is nine years younger than Chuang. Their wedding reception was held on September 3, 2016 in Taipei.

Filmography

Television

Film

Music videos

Theater

Awards and nominations

References

External links
 
 
 

1981 births
Living people
Taiwanese male television actors
Taiwanese male film actors
Taiwanese male stage actors
21st-century Taiwanese male actors
People from Changhua County